Kazuyoshi Ishikawa (born 6 November 1982) is a Japanese triple jumper. His personal best jump is 16.98 metres, achieved in October 2004 in Yamaguchi. This is the current Japanese university record.

He finished sixth at the 2002 World Cup and fourth at the 2003 Summer Universiade. At the Asian Championships he won a gold medal in 2003 and silver medals in 2002 and 2005. He also competed at the 2005 World Championships without reaching the final.

Personal best

International competitions

National titles
Japanese Championships
Triple jump: 2005, 2008, 2014, 2015

References

External links

Kazuyoshi Ishikawa at JAAF 
Kazuyoshi Ishikawa at TBS  (archived)

1982 births
Living people
Sportspeople from Nagano Prefecture
Japanese male triple jumpers
Competitors at the 2003 Summer Universiade
World Athletics Championships athletes for Japan
Japan Championships in Athletics winners
20th-century Japanese people
21st-century Japanese people